Queensbay Mall is the largest shopping mall in Penang, Malaysia. Located in Bayan Lepas, the building was completed in early July 2006 and was opened to the public in December 2006. Its main anchor tenant is AEON and a Golden Screen Cinema complex is housed within its top floor. The mall has basement parking and multilevel parking lot for shoppers.

Since its opening in 2006, Queensbay Mall has become one of the major retail centres in Penang, competing directly against more established shopping malls within the state like Gurney Plaza. Notably, both Queensbay Mall and Gurney Plaza are managed by CapitaMalls Asia, a subsidiary of the Singapore-based CapitaLand.

The location of Queensbay Mall was previously an abandoned site of the Bayan Bay Mall Project. It was developed by Bayan Bay Development Sdn Bhd, a joint venture 70% owned by Anson Perdana Bhd and 30% by Penang Development Corporation. After Anson Perdana Bhd fell into financial distress in 1998 following the 1997 Asian financial crisis and became defunct, CP Group led by executive chairman Tan Chew Piau intervened in 2003 and revived the project, which got its present name.

Retail Outlets 
The mall consists of five storeys and 879,930 sq ft of net lettable area, the largest of all shopping malls in Penang. With over 400 shop lots, it has attracted numerous well-known international brands to set up outlets within. The brands in Queensbay Mall include famous book stores like Borders, MPH and Popular, fashion names such as Gap, British India, Guess, Timberland, Giordano, Body Glove and Levi's, and the home furnishing brand Harvey Norman.

In addition, several restaurants, cafes and food stalls can be found inside Queensbay Mall, including Starbucks, Kenny Rogers Roasters, Nando's, Häagen-Dazs and Bee Cheng Hiang.

The main anchor tenant in Queensbay Mall is AEON, which runs a supermarket and apparel stores across the lower four floors.

Entertainment 
Queensbay Mall has a variety of entertainment options. The most well-known of all is the Golden Screen Cinemas at the top floor, with eight cineplexes. This is Golden Screen Cinemas' second flagship branch in Penang.

Other "main chain" outlets 

The largest hotpot chain in China Haidilao can be discovered opposite a wonderfood hotspot that has the trendiest products from all over the world, MiX Store. Other options include a basketball outlet and a Toys "R" Us store.

Location 
Queensbay Mall is situated at Persiaran Bayan Indah, Bayan Lepas, between the Penang Bridge and the Bayan Lepas Free Industrial Zone. It also lies at the seaside facing Jerejak Island. Nearby is the neighbourhood of Sungai Nibong.

See also 
 List of shopping malls in Malaysia

References

External links 
 Queensbay Mall

Shopping malls in Penang
Shopping malls established in 2006
2006 establishments in Malaysia
Buildings and structures in George Town, Penang